North Reef Island is an island of the Andaman Islands. It belongs to the North and Middle Andaman administrative district, part of the Indian union territory of Andaman and Nicobar Islands.

Geography
The island is in the North Reef Group of Islands, which also includes Latouche Island and Shark Island. It lies west of North Andaman.

Administration
Politically, North Reef Island, along neighboring North Reef Islands, is part of Diglipur Tehsil.

Fauna
North Reef Sanctuary is located on the island. it is dedicated to the nurturing of a variety of water birds.

Transportation
To arrive at North Reef Island, you have to reach Interview Island. To reach Interview Island, the only way is to charter a private fishing dinghy from Mayabunder jetty. From this island, you can try reaching North Reef Island.

References 

Islands of North and Middle Andaman district